Joseph Suglia is a screenwriter, novelist, and producer.

Career
In 2008, Suglia wrote the screenplay for Steve Balderson’s film Watch Out in collaboration with the director.  
The film, which was based on Suglia’s novel Watch Out, starred Matt Riddlehoover, Peter Stickles, and Victor Heck.    Watch Out premiered at the Raindance Film Festival, where it was nominated for Best International Feature.

In 2009, Suglia appeared with Karen Black, Mink Stole, Steve Balderson, Matt Riddlehoover, and Peter Stickles in Wamego: Ultimatum, a feature-length DVD documenting the making of Watch Out.

Bibliography

Fiction
 Watch Out - The Definitive Version (2008)
 Watch Out (2006)
 Years of Rage (2005)

Non-fiction
 Hölderlin and Blanchot on Self-Sacrifice (2004)

Filmography

 Wamego: Ultimatum (2009)
 Watch Out (2008)

References

Hölderlin and Blanchot on Self-Sacrifice
Community, Ritual, Identity
Putting God on Trial: The Relationship of Kafka to Leibniz
Air in the Paragraph Line #12
Focus on German Studies
Germanic Notes and Reviews
The American Catholic Philosophical Quarterly
Nineteenth-Century Literature Criticism
Revista latinoamericana de filosofia
 Bibliographie de la littérature française (XVI e -XX e siècles). Année 2005.
 The Communication of the Impossible
 A Plot Unraveling into Ethics: Woolf, Levinas, and "Time Passes".
 The Romantic Era.
 Narrative Space and Readers' Responses: A Phenomenological Account.
 Literature 1880-1945.
Bret Easton Ellis: American Psycho, Glamorama, Lunar Park
Sacrifice in Modernity
The Chicago Reader: Fall Books Special
diacritics
Watch Out Film
Watch Out at The Raindance Film Festival
Film Threat: Review of Watch Out
Film Threat: Review of Wamego: Ultimatum
The Daily Telegraph: Murder in Mind

21st-century American novelists
American male novelists
American film directors
American male screenwriters
Living people
21st-century American male writers
Year of birth missing (living people)
21st-century American screenwriters